Megatamainho is the second studio album by Brazilian musician, actor and director Gero Camilo, released in 2014. It was produced by Bactéria, former keyboardist and guitarist of Mundo Livre S/A, and it features partnerships with Luiz Caldas, Vanessa da Mata, Otto and Rubi. Camilo describes the album music as something with potency "for dance, for celebration". He also said that he didn't make an effort towards any genre, and that it comes naturally "from my relation with my taste, from receiving things without prejudice".

The album is a celebration of his 20 years living in São Paulo, which size also inspired the name of the record (which translates as "Mega Little Size") and where he met the musicians whom he collaborated with when creating the songs.

The title track speaks of borders and was inspired by a conversation Camilo had with fellow actor Caco Ciocler about the conflicts between Jews and Palestines. "Chuchuzeiro", was composed by rapper Criolo and deals with "love and lightness". Camilo said he admires Criolo's works "and the way he shows his political and human vision of poetry. Music has much to do with out roots, with forró, but without losing the critical tone".

Track listing

Personnel 
Musicians
 Gero Camilo - vocals
 Estevan Sinkovitz - guitar
 Djalma Rodrigues - guitar
 Bruno Freire - guitar
 Clayton Barros - acoustic guitar and twelve-string viola
 Jô do Vale - Rhodes
 João Carlos (João do Cello) - cello
 Livia Mattos - accordion
 Hugo Carranca - drums
 Toca Ogan - percussions
 Marcos Axé - percussion
 Malê - percussion
 Nino Silva - percussion
 Orquídeas do Brasil (former backing band for Itamar Assumpção)
 Rumbada (female percussion group)

Production
 Gero Camilo - production
 Bactéria - musical production
 Zé Cafofinho - arrangements

References 

2014 albums
Gero Camilo albums
Portuguese-language albums